Joseph Tobin (born 1950) is the Elizabeth Garrard Hall Professor of Education in the College of Education at the University of Georgia.

Biography
Tobin received his B.A. Degree from Earlham College and his PhD in Human Development at the University of Chicago. As a Japan Foundation Fellow, he studied in Tokyo with the Japanese psychoanalyst Takeo Doi who had great influence on his work. Tobin is married and has two sons.

Work
Tobin is an educational anthropologist and an early childhood education specialist. His research interests include cross-cultural studies of early childhood education, immigration, children and the media, and qualitative research methods. He is known for his books and video documentaries Preschool in Three Cultures: Japan, China, and the United States (1989) and Preschool in Three Cultures Revisited (2009).  His other books include Good Guys Don't Wear Hats: Children's Talk about the Media; Remade in Japan; Making a Place for Pleasure in Early Childhood Education; and Pikachu's Global Adventure: The Rise and Fall of Pokémon.  Tobin also led a major international project: Children Crossing Borders: Immigrant Parent and Staff Perspectives on Preschool and is currently leading the project: Deaf Kindergartens in Three Countries: Japan, France, and the United States.

Publications
"Preschool in Three Cultures: China, Japan, and the United States,"  Joseph J. Tobin, David Y.H. Wu, Dana H. Davidson, 1991, 
"Preschool in Three Cultures Revisited: China, Japan, and the United States," Joseph Tobin, Yeh Hsueh, and Mayumi Karasawa, 2011, 
"Teaching Embodied: Cultural Practice in Japanese Preschools," Akiko Hayashi and Joseph Tobin, 2015,

References

External links
personal website
[ office webpage at University of Georgia]

American anthropologists
1950 births
Living people
Earlham College alumni